Judge James may refer to:

Albert E. James (c. 1892–1952), judge of the United States Board of Tax Appeals
Robert G. James (born 1946), judge of the United States District Court for the Western District of Louisiana
William P. James (1870–1940), judge of the United States District Court for the Southern District of California

See also
Justice James (disambiguation)